1522 Kokkola, provisional designation , is a stony Vestian asteroid from the inner regions of the asteroid belt, approximately 9.5 kilometers in diameter. It was discovered on 18 November 1938, by pioneering Finnish astronomer Liisi Oterma at Turku Observatory in Southwest Finland. It was later was named for the town of Kokkola.

Classification and orbit 

The S-type asteroid and member of the Vesta family is also classified as LS-type, an intermediate to the L-types. It orbits the Sun at a distance of 2.2–2.5 AU once every 3 years and 8 months (1,331 days). Its orbit has an eccentricity of 0.07 and an inclination of 5° with respect to the ecliptic. Due to a precovery taken at Turku, Kokkolas observation arc was extended by 3 weeks prior to its official discovery observation.

Physical characteristics 

In May 1984, American astronomer Richard Binzel obtained a rotational lightcurve of Kokkola from photometric observations. Lightcurve analysis gave a well-defined rotation period of 5.83 hours with a brightness amplitude of 0.29 magnitude.

According to the survey carried out by NASA's Wide-field Infrared Survey Explorer with its subsequent NEOWISE mission, Kokkola measures 9.42 kilometers in diameter and its surface has an albedo of 0.206 (revised albedo fits from 2014). The Collaborative Asteroid Lightcurve Link assumes an albedo of 0.20 and derives a diameter of 9.57 kilometers with an absolute magnitude of 12.46.

Naming 

This minor planet was named for Kokkola, a Finnish town and port on the Gulf of Bothnia. The official  was published by the Minor Planet Center on 20 February 1976.

References

External links 
 Asteroid Lightcurve Database (LCDB), query form (info )
 Dictionary of Minor Planet Names, Google books
 Asteroids and comets rotation curves, CdR – Observatoire de Genève, Raoul Behrend
 Discovery Circumstances: Numbered Minor Planets (1)-(5000) – Minor Planet Center
 
 

001522
Discoveries by Liisi Oterma
Named minor planets
19381118